Jorge Justiniano González Betancourt (born 4 October 1936) is a Mexican retired general politician from the National Action Party. From 2006 to 2009 he served as Deputy of the LX Legislature of the Mexican Congress representing Chiapas.

References

1936 births
Living people
Politicians from Chiapas
National Action Party (Mexico) politicians
20th-century Mexican military personnel
21st-century Mexican politicians
Deputies of the LX Legislature of Mexico
Members of the Chamber of Deputies (Mexico) for Chiapas